Woodleaf may refer to:
Woodleaf, Arizona
Woodleaf, Napa County, California
Woodleaf, Yuba County, California
Woodleaf, North Carolina